Judge O'Brien may refer to:

Donald Eugene O'Brien (1923–2015), judge of the United States District Courts for the Northern and Southern Districts of Iowa
Ernest Aloysius O'Brien (1880–1948), judge of the United States District Court for the Eastern District of Michigan
Terrence L. O'Brien (born 1943), judge of the United States Court of Appeals for the Tenth Circuit